Donald Gilbert Adams (born December 18, 1938) is a Texas politician, attorney, and lobbyist who was president pro tempore of the Texas Senate, and a member of the Texas Senate, District 3. He also served in the Texas House of Representatives for District 7.

Personal life and education
Donald Gilbert Adams was born December 18, 1938 in Jasper, Texas to T. Gilbert Adams and Dess Hart Adams. His father was a county judge. In 1963, Adams graduated from Baylor University and Baylor Law School with a BBA and LLB.  After attending university, he practiced law in Lufkin, Texas for two years before returning to Jasper where he formed a legal partnership with his father. He married Linda Cullum, and the couple had 3 children: Don Jr., Debra, and Dinah. Linda Adams died on October 6, 2015 after a battle with Alzheimer's disease. They were married for 52 years.

Political career
Adams represented District 7 of the Texas House of Representatives during the 61st and 62nd legislature. While being a freshman representative, Adams was selected to study the revision of Texas Penal Code. Adams then represented Texas Senate, District 3 during the 63rd, 64th, and 65th legislature. During part of the 65th Legislature Adams served as Ad Interim president pro tempore of the Texas Senate. While serving in the Texas Senate, Adams was chairman of the Texas Industrial Council and the Texas Aircraft Pooling Board. He also served as vice chairman of the Texas Cancer Council. After retiring from the Texas Legislatures he became a lobbyist. Throughout his career Adams was affiliated with the Democratic Party.

References

Baylor Law School alumni
Presidents pro tempore of the Texas Senate
Democratic Party Texas state senators
Democratic Party members of the Texas House of Representatives
1938 births
Living people